Prosopis affinis is a species of flowering tree in the family Fabaceae, that is native to Argentina, Brazil, Paraguay, and Uruguay. Common names include algarrobillo, espinillo, ibopé-morotí, and ñandubay. It is threatened by habitat loss.

It is a honey plant.

References

External links

affinis
Plants described in 1825
Data deficient plants
Trees of Argentina
Trees of Brazil
Trees of Paraguay
Trees of Uruguay
Taxonomy articles created by Polbot